Level 10 may refer to:

Level 10 in English football league system (section Promotion and relegation rules for the top eight levels)
Level 10 (USA Gymnastics),  highest level in the USA Gymnastics Junior Olympics Program
Level10 Comics,a comic book comic publishing company based out of Mumbai, India
Level 10 (band), a heavy metal supergroup with Russell Allen as lead singer.
Level-10, a computer game company from the early 1980s.